The 2020–21 Exeter City season was the club's 119th year in existence and their ninth consecutive season in League Two. They finished 9th in the league, failing to qualify for the play-offs on the final day. The club reached the third round of the FA Cup, losing to Championship side Sheffield Wednesday. City were eliminated in the first round of the EFL Cup by Bristol City, and were knocked out of the EFL Trophy in the second round by Northampton Town.

The season covers the period from 1 July 2020 to 30 June 2021.

Review

September 
A tough League Cup draw away to Bristol City began Exeter's season, and despite a strong showing a young and inexperienced side lost 2–0 to the Championship club. That result was quickly followed up by a 3–2 win against Forest Green Rovers in the EFL Trophy the following Tuesday, before City began their League season on Saturday 12 September.

Exeter's League Two season began in the worst possible fashion as they conceded a goal inside the first two minutes of their opening League game away to Salford City. However, the Grecians galvanised and a strong end to the first half saw them go 2–1 up thanks to goals from Matt Jay and Joel Randall, the latter's first league goal for the club. Ash Hunter equalised in the second half to deny City the win, but it was still a strong showing against one of the pre-season promotion favourites.

A home loss against Port Vale was followed by another strong away showing, this time beating Mansfield Town 2–1 with young full-back Josh Key scoring his first league goal for the club.

October 
Unbeaten League Two leaders Cambridge United conceded their first league goal of the season at St James Park on October 3, as Matt Jay rolled home a penalty in the 16th minute. Joel Randall followed this up with another goal 18 minutes later, condemning the U's to their first league defeat of the season.

Harry Kite, Ben Seymour and Alex Hartridge all scored their first professional goals for the club against League One outfit Swindon Town in the EFL Trophy in a thrilling tie that finished 4–3 to City at the County Ground, before Alex Fisher produced a stunning top-corner curling shot in the last minute to save a point for the Grecians at Southend United.

After drawing 0–0 at Walsall, Jake Taylor and Ryan Bowman scored their first goals of the season against Crawley Town on 20 October, as their two late goals turned the game on its head to give City a 2–1 win. That was followed by another home win, this time a convincing 3–1 dismantling of Scunthorpe United. Between that Saturday and the following Tuesday both of City's first team goalkeepers, Lewis Ward and Jonny Maxted, suffered injuries and Exeter had to bring in Reading keeper Jökull Andrésson on a one-week emergency loan deal, ready to play against Leyton Orient and Carlisle United.

Andrésson only conceded once in his first two games as City drew 1–1 at Leyton Orient and then beat 10-man Carlisle United 1–0, with the 19-year-old keeper instantly winning over the belief and hearts of City fans on social media.

It was also at this time that City captain Jake Taylor got married, an event which coincided with his best run of goal scoring form in his career, as he scored four goals in five appearances in late October.

November 
A frustrating 2–2 at Morecambe began the month, as the Grecians controlled the majority of possession throughout the match but could not find the breakthrough for the winning goal.

However, an FA Cup match at home to National League North side AFC Fylde saw the Grecians get back to winning ways as, despite an early scare with Fylde going in front in the 11th minute, goals from academy graduates Matt Jay and Alex Hartridge turned the game around before half time and City held on to this one-goal lead until the end of the match.

Another 2–2 away draw, this time at Bradford City, slowed down City's league progress but Exeter were still going strong in the cup, thrashing West Brom's under-21s 4–0 to secure a first-place finish in their EFL Trophy group. That form still couldn't be replicated in the league and an astonishing 40-yard free-kick from Oldham Athletic striker Danny Rowe gave the Latics three points at St James Park, and meant that the Grecians still had not won a League match in November, with it now being the 21st of the month.

That was all to change in spectacular style at home to Colchester United on Tuesday 24th, as a hattrick from Ryan Bowman, two Matt Jay goals and a strike from Joel Randall dismantled Colchester 6–1 in City's highest scoring win for over 20 years. That match fuelled City with confidence as they headed to League One side Gillingham for the second round of the FA Cup, and a masterclass in the middle of midfield from Nicky Law, who scored once and provided two assists for Joel Randall, helped Exeter to overcome the Gills 3–2 and secure a spot in the third round of the FA Cup for the third time in six seasons and the first time under Matt Taylor as manager. That match was the last of Jökull Andrésson's emergancy loan as Exeter goalkeeper Jonny Maxted had fully recovered from his injury, ready to play against Grimsby Town.

December 
Exeter carried their fantastic goalscoring form into December, ripping apart Grimsby Town 4–1 on the 1st of the month. This goalscoring run continued into the Grecians' first game of the season in front of fans, albeit Cheltenham Town fans at The Jonny-Rocks Stadium as the Government relaxed COVID-19 restrictions to allow home fans back into open-air stadiums in limited numbers. City and Cheltenham did not disappoint the fans, as they played out a thrilling match with the Robins emerging 5–3 victors.

A weakened City team were then knocked out of the EFL Trophy in the second round as they lost 2–1 to League One Northampton Town but this loss did not deter the Grecians' startling League form and another high-scoring victory at home, this time against Tranmere Rovers, wowed the St James Park crowd. Ryan Bowman scored another hattrick, Matt Jay netted a penalty, and Jake Taylor added another strike to the best goal-scoring return of his career to wipe away Tranmere 5–0 in one of the best attacking performances seen at Exeter City in years.

In the most frustrating of turnarounds, Exeter could not repeat the same level of attacking ability just three days later at home to lowly Harrogate Town, and the Sulphurites beat the Grecians 2–1 in the shock result of the evening.

With matches at Stevenage and Newport County being called off for COVID-19 cases and a waterlogged pitch respectively, City only played one more match in December, a boxing day draw at home with Forest Green Rovers that featured a stunning goal from Archie Collins, a drive from outside the box that rebounded off the cross bar before going in.

January 
With City's game at Barrow on 2 January being called off due to a frozen pitch, Exeter had to wait until 9 January to play their first game of 2021, a home match in the third round of the FA Cup to Championship side Sheffield Wednesday. This was City's first game for two weeks but despite the extended break, they could not get the better of higher-league Wednesday and lost 2–0.

Exeter were quickly back in action in the league against former Premier League side Bolton Wanderers the following Tuesday, drawing 1–1 with the Trotters. Another away match, this time at Harrogate Town, was called off on 16 January due to an unplayable pitch, but the match was quickly rearranged for the 19th, and despite constant heavy rain in North Yorkshire the groundsmen at Harrogate managed to keep the rearranged fixture on. City struggled in their first away fixture for 45 days and couldn't break down a resilient Town so had to settle for a 0–0 draw.

Matt Taylor made his first signing of the transfer window on 21 January, announcing that central defender Sam Stubbs had moved to the club from Fleetwood Town on a free transfer. The announcement of Stubbs' signing had been due a few weeks before this date, but he tested positive for COVID-19 so there had to be some delay in confirming this transfer. Stubbs also moved to the Grecians on the back of a long injury lay-off at Fleetwood and Matt Taylor confirmed that he wouldn't be featuring in the Grecians' first team for a few weeks as he recovered back to full fitness.

A lack of goals in the team that scored so many was beginning to become a concern, but a 3–1 win over relegation-threatened Stevenage on 23 January helped dampen those fears, with Archie Collins opening the scoring with another thunderous shot into the same top corner as the goal he scored against Forest Green Rovers a month before.

The good feeling generated by that win was quickly shot though as the Grecians finished the month with back-to-back defeats to fellow promotion hopefuls Morecambe and Carlisle United, losing 2–0 and 1–0 respectively.

Between those two defeats first team goalkeeper Lewis Ward left the club on loan, joining League One club Portsmouth. Ward hadn't been playing since his return from injury for the Grecians and had been on the bench behind Jonny Maxted, and so when the opportunity to move to a higher league club had presented itself, he requested that the move go through as soon as possible. Reading stopper Jökull Andrésson was brought back to the club, this time on a six-month loan deal until the end of the season as Ward's replacement, and he made his second debut for the Grecians away at Carlisle.

February 
February 1 was the January transfer window deadline day, and City made a single signing, bringing in experienced Newport County winger Robbie Willmott on loan until the end of the season. Willmott made his debut the following day as a substitute away at Stevenage, with City facing the Hertfordshire club for the second time in just ten days due to games having to be rearranged because of COVID-19 cases at various clubs. Rory McArdle's first goal for the club, a glancing header from a freekick, secured a 1–0 win for City against the relegation-threatened club.

An in-form Bradford City visited St James Park on 6 February and despite Exeter's early dominance, the Bantams went into the half-time break 2–1 up due to defensive mistakes by the Grecians. This was turned around in the second half though, and thanks to Bowman's stooping header and Jay's slow penalty, the game was turned on its head and City won the three points.

Two more back-to-back away games at Barrow and Oldham Athletic were postponed as a cold spell hit most of the UK, with the Exeter squad actually arriving at Barrow's ground before the game was called off.

These postponed games gave City a rest before they played fellow promotion challengers Newport County at Rodney Parade for the rearranged fixture on Tuesday 16. Exeter made a poor start to the game with defender Alex Hartridge sent off after nine minutes for denying an obvious goal scoring opportunity. Despite having one man less than their opponents, Exeter still opened the scoring through Ryan Bowman. Just before half-time, the situation went from bad to worse, as Exeter were reduced to nine men with Bowman also receiving a straight red for elbowing an opponent. Against all the odds, nine man Exeter managed to hold Newport back until the 88th minute, and even then County could only score once and City escaped with a point.

Exeter's squad were given another rest after their match at Newport as the following Saturday's game against Grimsby Town was called off due to a waterlogged pitch, the first home game of the season to fall foul of the weather.

Then, Robbie Willmott scored his first City goal and Ben Seymour scored his first league goal in a 2–1 win against Colchester United, before City ended the month on a less positive note, losing at Crawley Town, with former City striker Tom Nichols scoring against the Grecians and Tom Parkes being shown City's third straight red card of the month.

March 
City began the month with an uninspiring 0–0 draw with Walsall at home. After two drab games against Crawley and Walsall, City returned to winning ways against Leyton Orient on Saturday 6th, with first half goals from Joel Randall and Matt Jay (twice) putting the Grecians in a comfortable 3–0 lead at half-time. It took Jay just five minutes into the second half to complete his first ever professional hattrick, coolly slotting home a penalty to secure a 4–0 win for Exeter. Jay continued this form into the following Tuesday when he scored a superb free-kick at Scunthorpe United, with Jack Sparkes netting his first league goal for the club to confirm City's first back-to-back wins since early February.

However, the Grecians couldn't turn this form into their first three consecutive league wins of the season when table-topping Cheltenham Town visited St James Park as, despite a strong performance from the Grecians, a last-minute headed goal from Andy Williams stole the three points for the Robins at the death. A trip to high-flying Tranmere Rovers followed the next weekend, and another defeat was compounded by the fact both of Tranmere's goals were scored from the penalty spot and Joel Randall suffered a season-ending injury while scoring City's equaliser.

Exeter dominated in their next game at Oldham Athletic, having the majority of the ball and three times as many shots as their opponents, but two opportunistic goals and a lack of luck on City's behalf condemned the Grecians to three defeats in a row for the first time this season.

Thankfully, this barren run was ended with a hint of luck on Saturday 27th against Salford City, in the Manchester club's first ever visit to St James Park. Exeter City had just one shot on target but that was all the Grecians needed to grind out a hard-fought 1–0 win against their fellow play-off rivals thanks to Matt Jay's 16th goal of the season.

Transfers

Transfers in

Loans in

Loans out

Transfers out

Pre-season
The Grecians announced they would play four pre-season friendlies against Bristol Rovers, Taunton Town, Tiverton Town and Truro City. Fans were only permitted to attend the Tiverton Town match.

Competitions

EFL League Two

League table

Results summary

Results by matchday

Matches

The 2020–21 season fixtures were released on 21 August 2020.

FA Cup

The draw for the first round was made on Monday 26, October. The second round draw was revealed on Monday, 9 November by Danny Cowley. The draw for the third round was made by Robbie Savage.

EFL Cup

The first round draw was made on 18 August, live on Sky Sports, by Paul Merson.

EFL Trophy

The regional group stage draw was confirmed on 18 August. The second round draw was made by Matt Murray on 20 November, at St Andrew's.

Group stage

Knock-out stage

Statistics

|-
!colspan=14|Players who left on loan during the season:

|-
!colspan=14|Players who left during the season:

|}

Goals record

Disciplinary record

References

Exeter City F.C. seasons
Exeter City